WABA may refer to:

 Waba or SuperWaba, a simplified version of Java aimed at portable devices
 WABA (AM), a radio station (850 AM) licensed to Aguadilla, Puerto Rico
 Washington Area Bicyclist Association helped establish Metropolitan Branch Trail
 West Asian Basketball Championship
 Women's American Basketball Association
 World Alliance for Breastfeeding Action
 Worldwide Aquatic Bodywork Association